Schinia, commonly called flower moths, is a large genus of moths belonging to the family Noctuidae. The genus has a Holarctic distribution with the vast majority of species being found in North America, many with a very restricted range and larval food plant.

Species and food plants

Unpublished species
Schinia  avemensis

References

 
Noctuoidea genera
Insects described in 1823